Jack Trainer (born 14 July 1952) is a former Scottish  footballer who played as a defender.

References

1952 births
Living people
Scottish footballers
Association football defenders
Rochdale A.F.C. players
Bury F.C. players
English Football League players
League of Ireland players
Expatriate association footballers in the Republic of Ireland